The UAAP Season 78 high school volleyball tournament started on August 22, 2015. The tournament venue is the Adamson University Gym in San Marcelino St., Ermita, Manila. Adamson is the tournament host. The number of participating schools in the boys' and girls' tournaments both increased to seven. Far Eastern University fielded boys' and girls' volleyball teams beginning season 77. Since there are now seven participating schools, the tournaments have a Final Four format. The UAAP Board decided to move the high school volleyball tournaments from 2nd semester to 1st semester due to the basketball juniors tournament being moved from the 1st semester to 2nd semester.

The UAAP Season 78 seniors' division volleyball tournament started on January 31, 2016. Originally, before the schedule was moved, the UAAP Season 78 seniors' division volleyball tournament opening was scheduled on February 13 and January 30. The tournament main venue is the Filoil Flying V Arena in San Juan City while selected games were played at the PhilSports Arena in Pasig, Smart Araneta Coliseum in Cubao, Quezon City, and the Mall of Asia Arena in Pasay. UP is the tournament host.

Ateneo De Manila University Blue Eagles claimed their back to back title after beating the National University Bulldogs in Games 1 and 2 of the best of 3 series.

On the other hand, the De La Salle University Lady Spikers won their 9th crown after defeating the defending champions Ateneo De Manila Lady Eagles in the do-or-die game of the finals.

Men's tournament

Season's team line-up

Elimination round

Team standings

Match-up results

Scores
Results to the right and top of the gray cells are first round games, those to the left and below are second round games.

Playoffs

Playoffs / Finals

Semifinals
ADMU vs UP ADMU with twice-to-beat advantage.
Elimination round results:
(Feb 21) ADMU def. UP3–0 • 25–16, 25–18, 25–14
(Mar 09) ADMU def. UP3–0 • 25–9, 27–25, 25–15
 
NU vs ADU NU with twice-to-beat advantage.
Elimination round results:
(Feb 03) NU def. ADU3–0 • 25–22, 25–22, 25–7
(Mar 06) NU def. ADU3–1 • 25–23, 25–23, 25–27, 25–22

Finals
ADMU vs NU   Best–of–three series
Elimination round results:
(Feb 27) ADMU def. NU3–0 • 25–19, 25–15, 25–15
(Mar 13) ADMU def. NU3–1 • 26–28, 25–23, 25–21, 25–17

Broadcast notes 

Awarding Ceremony host: Janeena Chan

Awards

 Most Valuable Player (Season): 
 Most Valuable Player (Finals): 
 Rookie of the Year: 
 Best Scorer: 
 Best Attacker: 
 Best Blocker: 
 Best Server: 
 Best Digger: 
 Best Setter: 
 Best Receiver:

Women's tournament

Season's team line-up

Elimination round

Team standings

Match-up results

Scores
Results to the right and top of the gray cells are first round games, those to the left and below are second round games.

Playoffs

Semifinals
ADMU vs UP ADMU with twice-to-beat advantage.
Elimination round results:
(Feb 14) ADMU def. UP3–0 • 25–19, 25–21, 25–21
(Mar 06) UP def. ADMU3–1 • 19–25, 25–22, 25–17, 25–22

DLSU vs FEU DLSU with twice-to-beat advantage.
Elimination round results:
(Feb 03) DLSU def. FEU3–0 • 29–27, 25–23, 25–20
(Mar 05) DLSU def. FEU3–2 • 25–14, 25–9, 22–25, 19–25, 15–7

Finals
ADMU vs DLSU   Best–of–three series
Elimination round results:
(Feb 27) DLSU def. ADMU3–0 • 25–22, 25–14, 25–18
(Apr 10) ADMU def. DLSU3–2 • 21–25, 25–22, 25–16, 21–25, 15–5

Broadcast notes 

Awarding ceremony hosts: TJ Manotoc and Janeena Chan

Awards

 Most Valuable Player (Season): 
 Most Valuable Player (Finals): 
 Rookie of the Year: 
 Best Scorer: 
 Best Attacker: 
 Best Blocker: 
 Best Server: 
 Best Digger: 
 Best Setter: 
 Best Receiver:

Special Awards
 Fudgee Barr O-Barr Sa Galing Player of the Season: 
 Manulife Up and Coming Player of the Season:

Players of the Week

Coaching changes
Adamson Falcons: Sherwin Meneses has resigned as Head Coach of the team due to a conflict between the coaching staff and team sponsor Akari Lights, during the 2nd elimination round. Adamson Falcons Men's Volleyball team head coach Domingo Custodio was assigned as the interim head coach of the women's team until the season ends.

Injuries
Ateneo Lady Eagles: Sophomore middle blocker Maddie Madayag suffers her season-ending right knee Anterior cruciate ligament (ACL) injury during a team practice session on March 15, 2016. She will undertake a surgery after Holy Week.
DLSU Lady Spikers: Graduating open hitter Cydthealee Demecillo suffers a knee sprain after their game against UP Fighting Maroons on March 16, 2016. Demecillo rested for two weeks to further heal her knee.

Boys' tournament

Elimination round

Team standings

Match-up results

Awards

 Most Valuable Player (Season): 
 Most Valuable Player (Finals): 
 Rookie of the Year: 
 Best Scorer: 
 Best Attacker: 
 Best Blocker: 
 Best Receiver: 
 Best Digger: 
 Best Setter:

Girls' tournament

Elimination round

Team standings

Match-up results

Awards

 Most Valuable Player (Season): 
 Most Valuable Player (Finals): 
 Rookie of the Year: 
 Best Scorer: 
 Best Attacker: 
 Best Blocker: 
 Best Receiver: 
 Best Digger: 
 Best Setter:

Overall championship points

Seniors' division

Juniors' division

In case of a tie, the team with the higher position in any tournament is ranked higher. If both are still tied, they are listed by alphabetical order.

How rankings are determined:
 Ranks 5th to 8th determined by elimination round standings.
 Loser of the #1 vs #4 semifinal match-up is ranked 4th
 Loser of the #2 vs #3 semifinal match-up is ranked 3rd
 Loser of the finals is ranked 2nd
 Champion is ranked 1st

See also
 UAAP Season 78
 NCAA Season 91 volleyball tournaments

References

2015 in Philippine sport
2016 in Philippine sport
2015 in volleyball
2016 in volleyball
UAAP Season 78
UAAP volleyball tournaments